Bieberstein Palace (Schloss Bieberstein) is a baroque palace that was built between 1710 and 1740 by Bamberg architect, Johann Dientzenhofer. It is located in the parish of Hofbieber, which is part of Langenbieber, and about 2 km south of Hofbieber on the hill of the Kugelberg, a southern spur of the Hessenliede. South of the Kugelberg the terrain descends into the valley of the Bieber. The palace is about 16 km east of Fulda, the county town.

References

Literature 
 Rudolf Knappe: Mittelalterliche Burgen in Hessen. 800 Burgen, Burgruinen und Burgstätten. 3. Auflage. Wartberg-Verlag, Gudensberg-Gleichen 2000, S. 204.
 Alex Zollmann: 800 Jahre Bieberstein. In: Hofbieber 1093–2003. Aus der Geschichte eines Dorfes. Arbeitskreis 'Chronik' Hofbieber, Nüsttal-Hofaschenbach 2003, S. 170–177.
 Dieter Leuthold: Der Kampf gegen die „modernen Heiden“. Hermann Lietz und die Gründung des Landerziehungsheims Schloß Bieberstein im Jahre 1904. – Fulda: Leben und Arbeit (Zs. der Hermann Lietz-Schule) 1969
 Rolf Müller (Hrsg.): Schlösser, Burgen, alte Mauern. Herausgegeben vom Hessendienst der Staatskanzlei, Wiesbaden 1990, S. 184.

External links 

 
 Stiftung Deutsche Landerziehungsheime: Internat Schloss Bieberstein

Castles in Hesse
Buildings and structures in Fulda (district)
Baroque architecture in Hesse
Rhön Mountains
Boarding schools in Germany